Athletics competitions at the 2022 Bolivarian Games in Valledupar, Colombia are being held from 1 to 5 July 2022 at the Athletics Stadium in the Centro de Alto Rendimiento Deportivo La Gota Fría cluster, with the marathon and walks being held at Vías Públicas Departamentales.

Forty nine medal events were originally scheduled to be contested; 48 events equally divided among men and women plus a 4 × 400 metres relay mixed event. However, on 30 June 2022, during the technical congress held prior to the start of the competitions the following events were cancelled due to lack of athletes: shot put, discus throw and hammer throw for men and 3000 metres steeplechase and javelin throw for women, reducing the total medal events to 44. A total of 240 athletes will compete in the events. The events were open competitions without age restrictions.

Colombia are the athletics competitions defending champions having won them in the previous edition in Santa Marta 2017.

Participating nations
A total of 9 nations (all the 7 ODEBO nations and 2 invited) registered athletes for the athletics competitions. Each nation was able to enter a maximum of 85 athletes; up to 2 men and 2 women for the individual events and one team for each relay event:

Venues
The athletics competitions were held in two venues, both in Valledupar. Road events (marathons and racewalks) took place at Vías Públicas Departamentales, while track and field events were held at Estadio de Atletismo José Luis Parada located within the Centro de Alto Rendimiento Deportivo La Gota Fría. The athletics stadium track has a World Athletics "Class 2 certificate", which was equipped by the Italian company Mondo.

Medal summary

Medal table

Medalists

Men's events

Women's events

Mixed event

References

External links
Bolivarianos Valledupar 2022 Athletics

2022 Bolivarian Games
Athletics at the Bolivarian Games
2022 in athletics (track and field)
International athletics competitions hosted by Colombia